Red Light is a 1949 American  film noir crime film directed and produced by Roy Del Ruth, starring George Raft and Virginia Mayo, and based on the story "This Guy Gideon" by Don "Red" Barry, featuring strong religious overtones.

It was one of several thrillers Raft made in the late 1940s.

Plot

Bookkeeper Nick Cherney is sent to jail for embezzling from Johnny Torno's trucking company. One week before getting out, he sees a newsreel showing Johnny welcoming home his brother Jess, a heroic Catholic chaplain just returned from a World War II prisoner-of-war camp. Nick decides to get back at Johnny and hires Rocky (a fellow-inmate being released ahead of Nick) to murder Jess.

Jess is staying in a local hotel room, about to depart for his first parish in another city.  Johnny arrives not long after his brother has been shot by Rocky. Knowing that he is about to die, Jess indicates that a clue can be found in the room's Gideon Bible. However, the book is not there.

Johnny investigates on his own, resulting in much tension with the police. He tracks down and questions people who occupied the hotel room, believing that one of them is in possession of the bible. He hires Carla North, herself a one-time resident of the room, to help him search. He insists she stay at his luxury apartment while he moves into his office.

While Johnny is questioning another hotel guest, he notices Rocky watching him and sets a trap. Rocky manages to escape, after Johnny wounds him.

Later, aboard a train, Rocky attempts to blackmail Nick, who deals with this by causing his ex-con acquaintance to fall off the train. Nick then goes to Johnny's trucking company office to look for the bible Carla has apparently found. While there, he murders manager Warni Hazard.

Johnny learns of this murder and returns to his apartment to ask Carla to locate Pablo Cabrillo, the last name on the list. But, she is tired of Johnny's obsessive nature and leaves him.  Johnny is then confronted by the police, who subsequently put a 24-hour watch on him. With help from his employees, he manages to slip away.

Johnny drives to see Pablo Cabrillo, who turns out to be a GI blinded in the war. He admits to stealing the Bible, because it was his only inspiration during his intense despair. Pablo agrees to let Johnny look at the bible, but they learn that it was stolen only an hour earlier by a young, beautiful woman.

Johnny angrily goes to church where, in a burst of rage, he breaks a stained-glass window that he himself had recently sponsored. Remorseful, he returns to his office to write a check to replace the window; while there he receives word that Carla has checked into a hotel.  Nick arrives at Johnny's office and agrees to help find Carla, who shortly arrives at the office with the bible.  The police show up moments later to tell Johnny that they found his gun—one he had taken from Rocky.

With Nick watching worriedly, Carla gives Johnny the missing Bible.  Inside it he finds not information about the killer's identity, but a reference to Romans 12:19 forbidding revenge, and a plea from his brother to not seek retribution. Nick thinks he is off the hook. Relieved, he turns to leave.

However, when he gets to the head of the stairs, he spots Rocky on the floor below.  In a shootout, Nick fatally wounds Rocky, but before he dies Rocky identifies Nick as the mastermind behind Jess's murder.  Holding all of them at gunpoint, Nick confesses in front of the police before Johnny shoots and wounds Nick.

Pursued by Johnny and the police, Nick  flees to the roof in a rainstorm.  Nick has a clear shot at Johnny, but is out of bullets.  Johnny aims at Nick, but remembers his brother's message.   Nick flees as the police close in, accidentally steps on the main power supply to Torno's huge neon sign, and is electrocuted.

Cast
 George Raft as Johnny Torno
 Virginia Mayo as Carla North
 Gene Lockhart as Warni Hazard
 Raymond Burr as Nick Cherney
 Harry Morgan as Rocky (listed as "Henry Morgan" in credits)
 Barton MacLane as Detective Strecker
 Phillip Pine as Pablo Cabrillo
 Arthur Franz as Father (Chaplain) Jess Torno
 Arthur Shields as Father Redmond
 William Frawley as a hotel night clerk
 Sen Young as Vincent, houseboy (uncredited)

Production
It was based on a story called Mr Gideon. Roy Del Ruth and his associate Joe Kaufman brought the film rights in May 1946 from writer Donald Barry and Producer Lou Rock. The originally announced wanting Frank Sinatra to play the lead.

Roy Del Ruth set up his production company at Monogram Pictures, who were trying to expand into more prestigious product. Del Ruth made It Happened on Fifth Avenue for them, one of Monogram's most expensive pictures to date. He was meant to follow it with Mr Gideon but the project was delayed.

The story was retitled Red Light after a survey. Del Ruth started doing background filming in San Francisco in June 1947. However, it was a while before filming of the actual movie began.

Monogram formed a subsidiary, Allied Artists, who would distribute their more prestigious movies. Del Ruth made The Babe Ruth Story for Allied Artists and they announced they would finance Red Light. Del Ruth wanted Edward G. Robinson, William Bendix and Charles Bickford for the main roles. He thought the budget would be around $1.25 to 1.5 million. In September 1948 Joseph Kaufman, who worked for Del Ruth, said they were trying to get Robert Ryan to play the lead.

In January 1949 it was announced that Monogram and United Artists had signed a deal whereby United Artists would distribute Red Light and another movie Gun Crazy. The films would be financed by Pioneer Pictures, a new company which Monogram half owned, the other half being owned by Eastern investors. George Raft was announced as star. Virginia Mayo was borrowed to play the female lead.

Raft was paid $65,000 for his role. He signed in February 1949 and filming started in March. The production manager, Joe Gilpin, died of a heart attack during filming.

Reception

Critical response
The Los Angeles Times said the film "generates suspense and promises to emerge as a taut, exciting melodrama" but that it was let down by its "religious reform theme".

The New York Times said the film was "in the main, a contest familiar to Raft's retinue of fans, complete with hard, laconic characters, a search for a culprit, a few fireworks and with the Word in the Good Book as its sole, extraordinary twist."

In 2004 film critic Dennis Schwartz said of the film, "Roy Del Ruth directs a routine film noir infused with themes of revenge and religion, as it veers more towards a regular crime drama except for photographic flashes that reveal the film's dark undertones. The film's classic noir shot is of the villainous Raymond Burr smoking and smiling as his frightened victim is being crushed to death while hiding under a trailer, as Burr has just kicked out the jack holding it up ... The film held my interest mainly because this was a perfect part for Raft and it was well-crafted."

References

External links
 
 
 
 
 
 Red Light analysis at Film Noir of the Week by Stone Wallace
 Red Light Review of film at Variety
 

1949 films
1949 crime drama films
American black-and-white films
American crime drama films
1940s English-language films
Film noir
Films scored by Dimitri Tiomkin
Films directed by Roy Del Ruth
United Artists films
Films based on short fiction
1940s American films